The New Jalpaiguri–Sitamarhi Weekly Express is an Express train belonging to Northeast Frontier Railway zone that runs between  and  in India. It is currently being operated with 1572/15724 train numbers on a weekly basis.

Service

The 15723/New Jalpaiguri–Sitamarhi Weekly Express has an average speed of 42 km/hr and covers 546 km in 13h. The 15724/Sitamarhi–New Jalpaiguri Weekly Express has an average speed of 45 km/hr and covers 546 km in 12h 5m.

Route and halts 

The important halts of the train are:

Coach composition

The train has standard ICF rakes with max speed of 110 kmph. The train consists of 19 coaches:

 1 First AC and Three-tier AC
 1 AC III Tier
 12 Sleeper coaches
 3 General
 2 Seating cum Luggage Rake

Traction

Both trains are hauled by a Malda Loco Shed-based WDM-3A diesel locomotive from Jalpaiguri to Sitamarhi and vice versa.

Rake sharing

The train shares its rake with 15721/15722 Paharia Express.

See also 

 Sitamarhi Junction railway station
 New Jalpaiguri Junction railway station
 Garib Nawaz Express
 Paharia Express

Notes

References

External links 

 15723/New Jalpaiguri - Sitamarhi Weekly Express
 15724/Sitamarhi - New Jalpaiguri Weekly Express

Transport in Siliguri
Transport in Jalpaiguri
Transport in Sitamarhi
Express trains in India
Rail transport in West Bengal
Rail transport in Bihar